Robert Scinto (September 3, 1946) is an American television soap opera director.

Directing credits

All My Children
 Director (1997-2002) 
 Occasional Director (2002-2004)

The City
 Director (entire run, 1995–1997)

Guiding Light
 Director (2005-2009)
 Occasional Director (2004-2005)

Love of Life
Director (late 1970s)

Loving
 Director (entire run, 1983–1995)

One Life to Live
 Occasional Director (2002-2004)

Awards and nominations
Daytime Emmy Award
Win, 2007, Directing, Guiding Light
Nomination, 2004, Directing, One Life to Live
Win, 2003, Directing, All My Children
Nomination, 1998–2002, Directing, All My Children
Nomination, 1989, Directing, Loving
Nomination, 1980, Directing, Love of Life

References

External links

American television directors
1946 births
Living people